ICAC Investigators 1996 is a 1996 Hong Kong crime television miniseries co-produced by Television Broadcasts Limited and the Independent Commission Against Corruption of Hong Kong, and the eighth installment of the ICAC Investigators series.

Cast and Crew

Episode 1: Flying Over Barriers (飛越關卡)
Written by To Chi-kit, Chan Man-keung. Directed by Chow Fai
Ti Lung as Cheung Tin-yam (張天任)
Ben Wong as Au-yeung Chun (歐陽俊)
Monica Chan as Wong Yeuk-ching (黃若菁)
Joe Ma as Steve Lung (龍子英)
Elvis Tsui as Lau Tai-pang (劉大鵬)
Joseph Lee as Wong Man-cheuk (王文卓)
Edward Mok as Cheung Sing-tung (張成東)
Tai Siu-man as Ng Ping-nam (吳炳南)
Ho Ying-wai as Ho Wai-chim (何偉占)
Deno Cheung as Cheung Kwong-ching (張光正)
Ruco Chan as Chan Chin-man (陳展文)
Cheung Hon-ban as Chow Hon-ban (周漢斌)
Lam Pui-kwan as Lam Suk-kwan (林淑君)
Shum Po-sze as Shum Po-chi (沈寶智)
Peter Cheung as Leung Kwok-wai (梁國威)
Wong Chun-ning as ICAC Investigator
Suen Yan-ming as ICAC Investigator
Marco Lo as ICAC Investigator
Lo Cheuk-nam as ICAC Investigator
Lau Wing-chun as ICAC Investigator
Tsang Lai-wan as Wong Cheuk-nam's wife
Wah Chung-nam as Blind Ping (盲炳)
Wong Man-piu as Piu (標)
Hui Sat-yin as Luk Kai Luk (大雞六)
Lee Yiu-king as Officer Chan (陳SIR)
Cheung Hung-cheung as Ho See-piu (何仕標)
Lee Hoi-sang as Boss Suen (孫老大)
Wong Wai-leung as Snake (蛇)
Mark Kwok as Kwok Fat (郭法)
Cheuk Fan as CID
Sunny Tai as CID
Cheung Chun-ping as CID
Ho Cheung-kwan as CID
Tam Hing-cheun as Customs Deputy Superintendent
Wong Wai-lam as Customs Inspector
Wong Kai-tak as Customs officer
Cheng Shui-hiu as Customs officer
Wong Tai-wai as Customs officer
Lo Kong as Customs officer
Yip Sing-chun as Customs officer
Chan Heung-ying as Customs officer
Wong Kin-fung as Customs officer
Tong Chun-ming as Customs officer
Shum Sing-ming as Customs officer
Cheung Hak as Customs officer
Shek Wan as Driver
Luk Yuen-fan as Karoke girl
Lee Wai-wah as Karoke girl

Episode 2: Alternative Game (另類遊戲)
Written by Cheung Lik. Directed by Terry Tong
Ti Lung as Cheung Tin-yam (張天任)
Monica Chan as Wong Yeuk-ching (黃若菁)
Amy Kwok as Yu Wing-han (余詠嫻)
Lawrence Ng as Ng Po-chiu (伍普照)
Lee Siu-kei as Chim Hung (詹雄)
Ai Wai as Lok Man-yiu (駱文耀)
Elton Loo as Chiu Ping-yuen (趙炳源)
Yeung Chi-to as Ching Chak-sze (程則師)
Joe Ma as Steve Lung (龍子英)
Peter Cheung as Leung Kwok-wai (梁國威)
Mark Kwok as Kwok Fat (郭法)
Ruco Chan as Chan Chin-man (陳展文)
Eric Li as ICAC Investigator
Suen Yan-ming as ICAC Investigator
Marco Lo as ICAC Investigator
Lo Cheuk-nam as ICAC Investigator
Lau Wing-chun as ICAC Investigator
Cheung Hon-ban as ICAC Investigator
Chung Kit-yee as ICAC Investigator
Wan Man-ying as Chim's underling
Chu Lok-fai as Chim's underling
Kitty Lau as Deputy Director of TELA

Episode 3: Evidence (証物)
Written by Chan Man-keung, Chow Fai. Directed by Lawrence Ah Mon.
Ti Lung as Cheung Tin-yam (張天任)
Ben Lam as Officer Wong (汪Sir)
Leung Kin-ping as Officer Lai (黎Sir)
Jerry Koo as Chiu Wai-to (趙偉圖)
Wong Siu-lung as Chun Ping-san (秦炳新)
Joe Ma as Steve Lung (龍子英)
Ho Ying-wai as Chim (占)
Cheng pak-lun as Chow Hon-man (周漢文)
Chan Chung-kin as Police Superintendent
Lee Wai-man as CID
Willie Wai as Tam Chi-keung (譚志強)
Yu Tin-wai as Ghost Tsang (鬼仔曾)
Ho Mei-ho as Ngau's wife
Wong Sing-seung as Lawyer
Wan Man-ying as Ngau's underling
Chan Po-ling as Chan Yuk-mui (陳玉梅)
Wong Ching-yung as Reporter A
Ng Wai-san as Reporter B
Suen Wai-hing as Apartment housekeeper
Chan Min-leung as Drug dealer
Wan Seung-yin as Tam Chi-keung's mother
Lulu Kai as Tam Chi-keung's girlfriend
Mark Kwok as ICAC Investigator
Lau Wing-chun as ICAC Investigator
Suen Yan-ming as ICAC Investigator
Lui Wing-yee as ICAC Investigator
Chung Kit-yee as ICAC Investigator
Lo Cheuk-nam as ICAC Investigator
Cheung Hon-ban as ICAC Investigator
Marco Lo as ICAC Investigator
Sunny Tai as CID
Cheung Chun-wah as CID
Wong Wai-tak as CID
Ho Cheung-kwan as CID
Cheng Shui-hiu as CID
Leung Chiu-ho as CID
Cheung Hak as CID
Wong Wai-lam as CID
Lau Wing-king as CID
Shum Sing-ming as CID
Wong Tai-wai as CID
Chan Hiu-wan as CID

Episode 4: The Awakening of the Albatron Dream (青雲夢醒)
Written by Cheung Lik, Chow Wai, Alex Cheung. Directed by Alex Cheung.
Ti Lung as Cheung Tin-yam (張天任)
Joe Ma as Steve Lung (龍子英)
Liu Kai-chi as Hung Kwok-chun (洪國津)
Sue Tam as Hung's wife
Tsang Yin-ting as Hung San-san
Jay Lau as Ann
Ho Ying-wai as Ho Wai-chim (何偉占)
Ling Hon as Lai Hon-cheung (黎翰章)
Wong Wai as Master Ma (馬爺)
Wong San as Siu Nam-chau (蕭南秋)
Lee Chi-kei as Hau Chi-kit (侯子傑)
Ben Wong Tin-tok as Ko Yu-chung (高裕忠)
Fong Kit as Pak Hon-ching (白漢清)
Tang Ho-wing as Wu Chan-fai (胡燦輝)
Ho Pik-kin as Lee Wing-kung (李榮公)
Lui Wing-yee as ICAC Investigator
Eric Li as ICAC Investigator
Wong Chun-ning as ICAC Investigator
Suen Yan-ming as ICAC Investigator
Marco Lo as ICAC Investigator
Cheung Hon-ban as ICAC Investigator
Lau Wing-chun as ICAC Investigator
Lily Liu as School principal
Ho Mei-ho as Music teacher
Wong Wai-tak as Cho
Cheung Chun-wah as Wo
Leo Tsang as Government official
Lai Sau-ying as Neighbor
Cho Chai as Neighbor
Au Ngok as Village leader
Tang Yu-chiu as Senator's assistant
Wan Seung-yin as Relative
Fung Shui-chun as Relative
Shek Wan as Relative
Tong Wai-na as Relative

Episode 5: The Eagle in the Web (網中鷹)
Written by Cheung Lik. Directed by Terry Tong
Simon Yam as To Wing-fat (杜永發)
Melvin Wong as Chow Chin-pang (周展鵬)
Cheung Kwok-keung as Ku Lap (顧立)
Joe Ma as Steve Lung (龍子英)
Ho Ying-wai as Ho Wai-chim (何偉占)
Kong Hon as Ngai Chi-kong (魏志剛)
Tam Yat-ching as Lee Ka-choi (李家才)
Peter Cheung as Leung Kwok-wai (梁國威)
Lam Pui-kwan as Lam Suk-kwan (林淑君)
Mark Kwok as Kwok Fat (郭法)
Deno Cheung as Cheung Kwong-ching (張光正)
Shum Po-sze as Shum Po-chi (沈寶智)
Cheung Hon-ban as Chow Hon-ban (周漢斌)
Chun Hung as Wai (威)
Lau Ho-wing as Mok Wing (莫榮)
Suen Yan-ming as ICAC Investigator
Marco Lo as ICAC Investigator
Eric Li as ICAC Investigator
Lau Wing-chun as ICAC Investigator
Lo Cheuk-nam as ICAC Investigator
Lui Wing-yee as ICAC Investigator
Lau Chiu-fan as Ronald
Hui Cheung-lung as Mak (麥)

External links
ICAC Investigators 1996 at Douban
ICAC Investigaors 1996 at Chinesemov.com

Hong Kong television series
TVB dramas
Hong Kong crime television series
ICAC Investigators (TV series)
1996 Hong Kong television series debuts
1996 Hong Kong television series endings
1990s Hong Kong television series